Suillus intermedius is an edible species of mushroom in the genus Suillus. It is found in North America, Costa Blanca Mountains-Spain.

See also
List of North American boletes

References

External links

intermedius
Fungi of North America
Edible fungi
Fungi described in 1971
Taxa named by Alexander H. Smith